The Dean of Christ Church is the dean of Christ Church Cathedral, Oxford and head of the governing body of Christ Church, a constituent college of the University of Oxford. The cathedral is the mother church of the Church of England Diocese of Oxford and seat of the Bishop of Oxford. The chapter of canons of the cathedral formed the governing body of the college from its foundation until the Christ Church (Oxford) Act of 1867, by which the Governing Body was expanded to include the Students (academics) in addition to the Dean and Chapter. The dean was ex officio head of the chapter and ipso facto head of the college. Since 26 April 2022, the position has been vacant. Professor Sarah Foot will take up the position from July 2023.

List of deans
From the diocese's foundation in 1542 until 1545, the cathedral was at Osney. There, the cathedral deans were:
 John London (1542–1543)
 Richard Cox (1543–1545, reappointed dean at Christ Church)

The academic deans of Christ Church's predecessor Oxford colleges were:
 John Hygdon (Dean of Cardinal College, 1525–1531; Dean of King Henry VIII's College, 1532–1533)
 John Oliver (Dean of King Henry VIII's College, 1533–1545)

Both the college and the see at Osney surrendered to the Crown on 20 May 1545. Christ Church, the double establishment of cathedral and college, was founded by letters patent on 4 November 1546.

 Died in office

References

Deans of Christ Church
Deans of Christ Church
 
Deans of Christ Church
Christ Church, Oxford
Christ Church
Christ Church, Oxford